The cabinet of Yemeni Prime Minister Ahmed Obaid bin Dagher was sworn in before president Abdurabbu Mansour Hadi on 4 April 2016.

List of ministers

See also 

 Politics of Yemen

References 

Cabinets of Yemen
2016 establishments in Yemen
Bin Dagher Cabinet